Bataille de neige, also known as Snowballing, is an 1897 French short silent film produced by the Lumiére brothers. Filmed in Lyon, France, it depicts a number of individuals engaged in a snowball fight on a city street.

Plot
The camera is centered on a pathway made through a snow-covered city street. On both side of the pathway, several men and women are engaged in a snowball fight. A cyclist rides into the path of the fight, and is hit by snowballs, causing him to lose control of his bicycle and fall to the ground. His cap is flung onto the pathway. One male participant in the engagement grabs hold of the cyclist's bicycle and lifts it off the ground, and the fallen cyclist scrambles to his feet and yanks his bicycle away from the participant. After retrieving possession of his bicycle, the cyclist climbs back atop it and rides away.

Production
Bataille de neige was shot in Lyon, France, with a cinématographe, an all-in-one camera, which also serves as a film projector and developer. As with all early Lumière movies, this film was made in a 35 mm format with an aspect ratio of 1.33:1.

Current status
Given its age, the copyright on this short film has now expired. It is featured in a number of film collections, including The Movies Begin – A Treasury of Early Cinema, 1894–1913. In 2020 the New York Times did a feature article about the film, written by Sam Anderson, after a Russian amateur film restorer posted a cleaned up and colourized version of the film to YouTube. The result is "shockingly modern" said Anderson.

References

External links 
 

1897 films
French black-and-white films
French silent short films
1897 short films
Films shot in Lyon
1890s French films